The Canadian men's national lacrosse team represents Canada in men's international lacrosse competitions. Traditionally Canada has been one of the leading nations in international play, placing among the top three at the World Lacrosse Championship every year since the tournament's inaugural year in 1967. Canada has a long-standing rivalry with the United States national lacrosse team as they both frequently find themselves facing off against each other.

The team is primarily made up of professional players who compete in Premier Lacrosse League. However, many players also play in the National Lacrosse League and are members of Canada national indoor lacrosse team.

Past Team Canada squads have included lacrosse greats such as Gary Gait, Paul Gait and Tom Marechek.

Competition achievements

Olympic Games
Canada had two representatives during the 1904 Summer Olympics which included a club team from Winnipeg, Manitoba and another team made up of players from the Mohawk nation.

World Championships

Rosters

2018 World Lacrosse Championship 

Sources:

2014 World Lacrosse Championship

Starting attack in first game versus US (7/10/14)

*   MLL = Major League Lacrosse, outdoor/field lacrosse, season from April to August, roster as of July 2014

**NLL = National Lacrosse League, indoor lacrosse, season from December to April, roster as of July 2014

Starting defense in first game versus US (7/10/14)

Remaining roster

2014 coaches 
Head coach Randy Mearns: head coach of Canisius College for 17 years
Assistant coach Matt Brown: offensive coordinator at the University of Denver.

2010 World Lacrosse Championship 

Roster for the 2010 World Lacrosse Championship.

References

External links
Official website of Team Canada
Official website of Canadian Lacrosse Association

Lacrosse teams in Canada
National lacrosse teams
lacrosse